Joseph Henry Wilfred Sénéchal MM, BCL (August 7, 1918 – February 11, 2000) was a Canadian lawyer, a decorated World War II soldier, and a politician.

He was born in Campbellton, New Brunswick. Immediately upon the outbreak of World War II in 1939, the eighteen-year-old Wilfred Sénéchal volunteered for duty with the Canadian Army, serving until his discharge in 1945 in the months following Victory in Europe Day. Sénéchal served overseas with the Royal Canadian Infantry Corps as a member of  New Brunswick's Carelton and York Regiment. He was part of the Dieppe Raid in which more than sixty percent of the men who made it ashore were either killed, wounded, or captured. The British government awarded him the Military Medal for bravery in battle.

On returning home, Sénéchal pursued a secondary education, graduating in 1954 from the University of New Brunswick with a Bachelor of Civil Law degree.

Political career
In 1967, Sénéchal was a successful candidate for the Liberal Party in the New Brunswick general election, winning a seat in the Legislative Assembly of New Brunswick as the member for Restigouche County. He was made Deputy Speaker of the 46th New Brunswick Legislative Assembly. In the 1970 election Sénéchal lost his bid to win a seat in the City of Campbellton to the popular former Progressive Conservative Party leader, Charles Van Horne. In 1978, he lost to incumbent Fernand Dubé in the City of Campbellton riding in the 1978 provincial election.

Sénéchal died February 11, 2000, at the Campbellton Regional Hospital. He is buried in the Notre-Dame-des-Neiges Church Cemetery (Our Lady of Snow Church Cemetery).

References
 The Military Medal, National Archives of the United Kingdom
 Legislative Assembly of New Brunswick Journals

1918 births
2000 deaths
Canadian military personnel of World War II
Canadian recipients of the Military Medal
University of New Brunswick alumni
Lawyers in New Brunswick
New Brunswick Liberal Association MLAs
People from Campbellton, New Brunswick
University of New Brunswick Faculty of Law alumni
Burials at Notre Dame des Neiges Cemetery